The Australian Department of the Environment was a department of the Government of Australia that existed between September 2013 and July 2016. The department was charged with responsibility for developing and implementing national policy, programs and legislation to protect and conserve Australia's environment and heritage.

Structure
The department was an Australian Public Service Department of State in the environment portfolio, under the Public Service Act 1999.

The head of the department was its Secretary, Dr Gordon de Brouwer , responsible to the Minister for the Environment, the Hon. Josh Frydenberg .

History
The department was formed by way of an Administrative Arrangements Order issued on 18 September 2013. It absorbed the responsibilities of the former Department of Sustainability, Environment, Water, Population and Communities (DSWEPaC) and climate change from the former Department of Industry, Innovation, Climate Change, Science, Research and Tertiary Education.

The department was dissolved in July 2016 and its functions, along with energy policy functions, were moved to the newly established Department of the Environment and Energy.

From when it was established in September 2013 to when it was dissolved in July 2016 the department faced significant cuts (25 per cent cut from the organisation's budget over four years), in line with the Coalition Government's environmental deregulation policies.

Mission 
The stated aims of the department were to achieve the protection and conservation of the environment; to ensure that Australia benefits from meteorological and related sciences and services; and to see that Australia's interests in Antarctica are advanced. The department developed and implemented national policy, programs and legislation to protect and conserve Australia's environment and heritage.

Operational activities 
The functions of the department were broadly classified into the following matters:

The Great Barrier Reef
Environment protection and conservation of biodiversity
Air quality
National fuel quality standards
Land contamination
Meteorology
Administration of the Australian Antarctic Territory, and the Territory of the Heard Island and McDonald Islands
Natural, built and cultural heritage
Environmental information and research
Ionospheric prediction
Co-ordination of sustainable communities policy
Population policy
Urban environment
Development and co-ordination of domestic climate change policy
Renewable energy target policy, regulation and co-ordination
Greenhouse emissions and energy consumption reporting
Climate change adaptation strategy and co-ordination
Co-ordination of climate change science activities
Renewable energy
Greenhouse gas abatement programs
Community and household climate action
Water policy and resources

Programs 
The department managed a number of major programs. The most significant of those dealing with natural resource management came under the umbrella of the Natural Heritage Trust and the National Action Plan for Salinity and Water Quality. Both the Trust and National Action Plan were administered jointly with the Department of Agriculture.

Divisions 
Divisions of the department included the Australian Antarctic Division, Supervising Scientist Division, Heritage Division, Parks Australia, Policy and Communications, Australian Wildlife, Sydney Harbour Federation Trust, Australian Land and Coasts plus a number of executive agencies and statutory authorities.

Environmental protection 
The Department of the Environment administered environmental laws, including the Environment Protection and Biodiversity Conservation Act 1999 and a range of other Acts. It was also responsible for Australia's participation in a number of international environmental agreements.

Islands administration 
The department administered areas of the Coral Sea Islands, Heard Island and the McDonald Islands, and oversees certain policy areas in Norfolk Island and Christmas Island.

References

External links
 
 History of Australian Government Environment Ministers
 Directory of Australian Environment Departments
 Parks Australia
 australia.gov.au

Environment
Australia, Environment
2013 establishments in Australia
2016 disestablishments in Australia
Australia